Aeroperlas (acronym for Aerolíneas Islas de Las Perlas) was a regional airline based in Panama City, Panama. It was the third largest airline in the country, surpassed only by Air Panama and Copa Airlines. From its hub at Marcos A. Gelabert and Enrique Malek International airports, Aeroperlas operated over 50 daily scheduled flights to 15 domestic destinations, as well as charter and courier flights. It operated services as part of the Grupo TACA regional airlines system.

On February 29, 2012, Aeroperlas ceased operations due to financial problems.

History

Inauguration and expansion years

The airline was founded in June 1970 as Aerolíneas Islas de las Perlas and started operations shortly after. It was a state-owned company from 1976 until 1987, when it was sold to private owners.

During the late 1990s, Aeroperlas was owned by APAIR (80%) and the parent company of American Eagle Airlines, AMR Corporation (20%). According to Dan Garton, AMR took a stake in Aeroperlas to find a way of streamlining American Eagle's fleet and placing their Shorts 360 fleet with another airline. It was unclear if AMR remained as a shareholder in the airline in 2009. In 1996, Aeroperlas begun international operations, launching services to Costa Rica.

In 2004, Aeroperlas became an affiliate member of Grupo TACA and made a big improvements in terms of security.

In October 2007, the airline became the first Panamanian regional airline to be certified under the strict regulations of Panama's Civil Aeronautic Authority (ACC) agency. It was also the first airline in Panama to neutralize  emissions from the air, because of a partnership with nature conservation group ANCON, which included the promotion of trees conservation at a private reserve in Darién Province.

In July 2011, Aeroperlas started scheduled flights from the domestic terminal of Tocumen International Airport to Chirquí and Bocas del Toro provinces, with a stopover at Albrook "Marcos A. Gelabert" International Airport.

Demise and closure

The beginning of the end for Aeroperlas came in 2010, when two well-publicized incidents involving ATR 42 aircraft caused Panama's Civil Aeronautic Authority to raise several safety and maintenance issues. The public's confidence in Aeroperlas took a downturn as a consequence, with passenger numbers dropping by one-third. This caused Aeroperlas to suffer serious financial problems and to withdraw all the de Havilland Canada DHC-6 Twin Otters from the fleet, which were sold to other airlines or scrapped. 

In February 2012, hundreds of people from the Ngobe-Bugle tribe blocked several points of the Pan-American Highway in Panama for almost a week, protesting against a mining project in Cerro Colorado. This caused major disruptions in traffic to the extent that the Minister of Tourism at that time, Salomoh Shamah, decided to create a nationwide airlift to move people and tourists who were stranded on the highway, at bus terminals and airports, and critical supplies without any cost. This situation aggravated Aeroperlas' financial problems to the point of entering Chapter 11 bankruptcy protection.

On February 29, 2012, Aeroperlas ceased operations, citing market conditions and an obsolete business model. Around 150 employees were left without work, and they were transferred to Air Panama along with the routes left by the airline, and Copa Airlines. On March 6, 2012, Aeroperlas made its last official scheduled flight from Tocumen Airport to Bocas del Toro, thus ending 41 years of operation.

Destinations
Aeroperlas operated services to the following scheduled regional destinations:

Fleet

Final fleet
The Aeroperlas fleet included the following aircraft:

Retired fleet
The airline formerly operated the following aircraft:

2 Beechcraft Model 99
2 Canadair CC-109 Cosmopolitan
15 de Havilland Canada DHC-6 Twin Otter 
4 Embraer EMB-110 Bandeirante
3 GAF Nomad
8 Shorts 360

Accidents and incidents
During its early years of operation, Aeroperlas had a less-than-admirable safety record (as detailed below). However, since its commercial affiliation with TACA Airlines in 2004, operational procedures were improved and safety technology on aircraft were upgraded. The installation of a new, safety-focused management team in late 2005 improved Aeroperlas' safety record. In 2006, according to official numbers published by the Panamanian Civil Aviation Authority, Aeroperlas suffered just one minor incident - the same safety record as Panama's Copa Airlines achieved in the same period.

As of May 15, 2007, Aeroperlas had a clean safety record and started pointing to its safety strength in commercial activities (e.g.; its "Fly Safely, Fly Aeroperlas" campaign).

Hijackings
On July 5, 1990, De Havilland Canada DHC-6 Twin Otter was hijacked. The hijacker(s) demanded to be taken to Colombia. The hijacking lasted less than one day. The Twin Otter was stolen by the Revolutionary Armed Forces of Colombia on the same day on a flight from Colón and was destroyed in August 1990.

See also
List of defunct airlines of Panama

References

External links
 Aeroperlas
 Aviation Safety Net

Airlines established in 1970
Airlines disestablished in 2012
Avianca
Defunct airlines of Panama
Companies based in Panama City
Grupo TACA